Erythrocarpon is a fungal genus in the family Chaetomiaceae. This is a monotypic genus, containing the single species Erythrocarpon microstomum.

References

Sordariales
Monotypic Sordariomycetes genera
Taxa described in 1886